exa is a command-line utility for listing files. It is promoted as "a modern replacement for ls" with features not present in ls, such as showing git status. exa is one of the first applications written in Rust to be included in Fedora, openSUSE, and Gentoo.

References

External links 

Command-line software
Free software programmed in Rust